This page serves as a timeline to show when analog devices were first made with digital circuits and systems.

1642: Blaise Pascal invents the mechanical calculator.  This calculator could work in base 6, 10, 12 and 20.
1820: Thomas de Colmar invents the arithmometer.  Its production release in 1851 marks the beginning of the mechanical calculator industry.
1822: Difference engine: First mechanical computer created by Charles Babbage.
1837: Analytical engine: Mechanical general-purpose computer created by Charles Babbage.
1843: Fax machine: a scanning, rasterized, digital replacement for the vectorized, analog telautograph."The Secret Life of the Fax Machine" by Tim Hunkin
1847 (?) : piano roll: a digital recording of which notes were played.
1877: gramophone record: an analog recording that more-or-less replaces the digital piano roll.
1921: Edith Clarke patents the "Clarke calculator", a graphical calculator for simplifying calculations of inductance and capacity for electrical transmission lines.
1920s, Bell Labs designed the first digital speaker.  The product was abandoned before its release due to cost, size, unreliability, and overall impracticality.  Even though many analog speakers have labels that say "digital", digital speakers today remain unavailable commercially. Digital speakers
1940(?) bookkeeping using Charga-Plates to imprint account numbers, rather than writing them by hand.
1941, Computer: Konrad Zuse develops the first digital computer, the Z3 (computer)
17 November 1947, Transistor: John Bardeen, Walter Brattain, and Bill Shockley at AT&T Bell Labs made the first transistor.
1951, Audio recording: Geoff Hill plays back the first digital audio recording of Colonel Bogey's March.
1954, digital voltmeter replaces analog galvanometer.
1970, Watch: Pulsar (watch) helped Hamilton Watch Company make real the prototype for the digital watch that Hamilton Watch Co. designed for the 1968 film 2001: A Space Odyssey.  The watch was completed in 1972 and sold for US$2,100.Watch#Digital
1973, Telephone service: The first digital phone message was relayed over the ARPANET system.
December 1975, Still image: Kodak engineer Steven Sasson creates the first digital camera, weighing eight pounds and saving images to a cassette tape.  Exposure time was 23 seconds. Digital camera#Early development
1979 (?), Compact Disc
1982, Video recording: The first digital video technology was made available.
March 1, 1997, Player Piano: QRS and Baldwin collaborate to produce the first MIDI-compatible player piano.
February 13, 1998, Player Violin: QRS patents the first MIDI-compatible player violin.
October 1, 1998, Television: British Sky Broadcasting launches the first digital television network. British Sky Broadcasting#Move to Digital
January 31, 2005, Credit card: Fujitsu patents the Wireless Wallet, a cell phone that doubles as an electronic credit card for more secure transactions.

 (?) digital filter
 (?) magnetic stripe card, an even more digital replacement of Charga-Plates
 (?) smart card, an even more digital replacement of magnetic stripe card
 (?) Jacquard machine, a fascinating genre of computing machine used to automate textile machinery

Notes

Sources

Digital technology
Digital electronics
Dynamic lists
Lists of events
Technology timelines
Lists of inventions or discoveries